Corsage is a 2022 historical drama film written and directed by Marie Kreutzer. It stars Vicky Krieps, Florian Teichtmeister, Katharina Lorenz, Jeanne Werner, Alma Hasun, Manuel Rubey, Finnegan Oldfield, Aaron Friesz, Rosa Hajjaj, Lilly Marie Tschörtner and Colin Morgan.

The film, an international co-production between Austria, Germany, Luxembourg and France, debuted in the Un Certain Regard section of the Cannes Film Festival on 20 May 2022. It was released in Austria and Germany on 7 July 2022, and in France on 25 January 2023.

Summary
Empress Elisabeth of Austria, who is semi-estranged from her philandering husband, begins to act oddly as she nears her 40th birthday. The empress is renowned for her beauty and spends an obsessive amount of time measuring her weight, refusing to eat, and passing comments about her looks.

Cast

Production
In February 2021, it was announced Vicky Krieps, Florian Teichtmeister, Manuel Rubey, and Katharina Lorenz had joined the cast of the film, with Marie Kreutzer directing from a screenplay she wrote. Krieps is also the film's executive producer.

The film is a co-production between Austria's Film AG Produktion, Germany's Komplizen Film, Luxembourg's Samsa Film, and France's Kazak Productions. With a €7,5 million budget ($8.1 million), the production is 58.62% Austrian, 21.34% Luxembourgish, 10.03% German, and 10.01% French. The film was financially backed by Eurimages, the Austrian Film Fund, Luxembourg Film Fund, FISA – Film Industry Support Austria, the Vienna Film Fund and FilmFernsehFonds Bavaria.

Principal photography began on 2 March 2021, and wrapped on 7 July 2021. Filming took place in Austria, Luxembourg, France, Belgium and Italy; locations included the Hofburg and Schönbrunn Palace in Vienna, and Eckartsau Castle in Lower Austria.

When asked how much of the film was real and how much was fiction, Corsages director and screenwriter Marie Kreutzer said she could not tell in percent because she could not even remember exactly, but that some parts were made up, such as the ending, and also the meeting between Elisabeth and Louis Le Prince, which did not happen in real life.

Although Corsage has been compared to Sofia Coppola's Marie Antoinette (2006) due to the use of modern music and anachronisms, director Marie Kreutzer said she does not like Coppola's film and does not want people to think of it.

Abuse allegations and #MeToo Movement in Austria
On 18 June 2022, Austrian director Katharina Mückstein shared an Instagram story that read: "Tonight a perpetrator will be on stage and will be applauded. And there is nothing we can do to counter that. It's devastating. I wish all those affected good nerves. #MeToo didn't even start in Austria". No name was given, but the only event of that kind taking place in Austria that night was the premiere of Corsage in Vienna, which led to speculation that Mückstein was referring to someone who worked in this film. Mückstein later said that she could not name the man due to legal reasons.

Mückstein's Instagram story inspired several women to share their own experiences with sexual harassment, sexism, racism, homophobia and abuses of power in the Austrian film and theatre community, which generated a lot of media attention and sparked a new wave of the MeToo movement in Austria. Corsage'''s director, Marie Kreutzer, told Austrian magazine Profil on 2 July 2022 that she learned about the rumors about one of the actors from Corsage "a long time ago" when the project was already underway, but as long as there are only rumors and no court-confirmed evidence, she will never remove or dismiss a staff member from the stage based on rumors, and if there are neither concrete allegations nor a procedure against someone, she would act as a judge if she reacted with consequences. "There are neither concrete allegations nor those affected who have contacted authorities to articulate something concrete there. That's what makes the case so problematic. Even though I've worked very well with him and I like him, I can't put my hand on the fire for him. I do not check the reputation of my performers or my team. What lies in their past I cannot and do not want to research completely. I can only urge that official contact points be included and that all of this is not just carried out among colleagues and like-minded people. You have to take steps, not just talk about it behind closed doors. There were certainly reports about this man, but again they only came from people who were neither affected themselves nor had anything to testify directly. One should stick to the facts, because passing on rumors can seriously damage people; I appreciate Katharina Mückstein extremely for her attitude and her commitment to film politics, we are definitely on the same side. But I would definitely have chosen a different path", she said.

On 9 January 2023, lead actress and executive producer Vicky Krieps was asked about the alleged abuser in the cast of Corsage on Instagram. She said: "So, a feminist film made by two women should be discarded because of the misconduct of a male colleague? (Second question) Who exactly is being harmed by this?".

Florian Teichtmeister
On 13 January 2023, it was reported that actor  (who portrayed Emperor Franz Joseph I of Austria in Corsage) has been charged with possession of child pornography. In the middle of Summer 2021, Teichtmeister's girlfriend at the time discovered a pornographic image of a child on his mobile phone and informed the police. During a search of Teichtmeister's apartment, police found around 58,000 files with pornographic depictions of minors in a total of 22 data carriers such as laptops, desktops, mobile phones, USB sticks and memory cards collected between February 2008 and August 2021. The investigators found no evidence that Teichtmeister had passed on data, but he is said to have taken photos of minors himself at film locations and subsequently arranged them into collages with speech bubbles with pornographic content. According to Teichtmeister's lawyer, Michael Rami, his client "fully confesses" and will plead guilty in the forthcoming trial. Teichtmeister's lawyer said that he is accused of a "purely digital crime", meaning that he has not committed any criminal acts against people. The trial is scheduled to begin on 8 February 2023 at the Vienna Criminal Court. Teichtmeister faces up to two years in prison.

Following the reports, Austrian public broadcaster ORF–which co-produced Corsage–stated that it will refrain from producing and broadcasting works with Teichtmeister with immediate effect. The cinema chain Cineplexx also reacted by removing Corsage from its theaters in Austria. Corsages producers, Johanna Scherz and Alexander Glehr stated; "Today we learned of the charges against Florian Teichtmeister for the first time and as film producers and parents we are deeply shocked. Over the weekend we will decide together with the director of the film, Marie Kreutzer, what this means for the film and we will inform you in good time." On 15 January 2023, Kreutzer released a statement saying that she was "sad and angry that a feminist film that more than 300 people from all over Europe worked on for years may be tarnished and damaged by the horrific actions of one person". Kreutzer said she was informed of the rumors about Teichtmeister in Autumn 2021, after filming for Corsage had wrapped, and when the actor was inquired about these rumors, he "convincingly assured us (and others) of their falsity," she said.

Rumors about Teichtmeister have been circulating in the Austrian press since September 2021, when daily newspaper Der Standard published an article reporting that there was talk of a "successful local theater and film actor who is said to be hoarding child pornographic material". The actor's ex-partner reported him, and he was said to have physically attacked and verbally threatened her during their relationship. Nobody was named at the time, but insiders quickly found out that it was Teichtmeister, according to Austrian magazine Profil, which also stated that Katharina Mückstein's Instagram post on 18 June 2022 was meant for a different actor, and Mückstein herself later stated that she was not talking about Teichtmeister. Teichtmeister initially denied the allegations by claiming it was an act of revenge by his former partner.

Film & Music Austria (FAMA) decided that Corsage will continue to be Austria's official submission for the Oscars in the International Feature Film category despite the charges against Teichtmeister. The film's international distributors such as IFC Films (United States), Picturehouse Distribution (UK and Ireland), Bim Distribuzione (Italy), Ad Vitam (France) and Alamode (Germany) agreed with the statements from Kreutzer and the film's production company that the film should not be overshadowed by the actions of one person, and there is no indication that Corsage will be removed from theaters in any of these countries. The film's international sales handler mK2 declined to comment on the situation.Kronen Zeitung also reported that the fact that Corsage remained as Austria's candidate for the Oscars following the charges against Teichtmeister has divided opinions in the country. On 17 January 2023, Corsage's production company, Film AG, issued a statement saying that the underage actors who worked on the film were never left unsupervised and that there was little or no contact with Teichtmeister behind the camera. The company also said that there was a strict ban on cell phones and photography on the set.

Further allegations
Austrian newspaper Exxpress reported on 15 January 2023 that another actor from Corsage has been accused of sexual assault by an anonymous insider of the film scene. "As with Teichtmeister, everything should be covered up with this actor so that the film project is not damaged. Again, many people know about the allegations, and again nobody is bringing it to the public," reported the whistleblower who informed Exxpress in June 2022 about the allegations against Teichtmeister. "In the industry it is known that there are also serious allegations against another Austrian actor. During the shooting of Corsage there were several serious sexual assaults on the film set. And the scene is also silent about that again," the insider said. Exxpress also reported that the film's director Marie Kreutzer had been informed about these cases, and that the name of the actor is known to the newspaper, but Austria's media law does not allow him to be named. Der Standard also reported that there are allegations against another actor from the film. Kreutzer confirmed to Der Standard on 16 January 2023 that her response to Mückstein's post in July 2022 was not about Teichtmeister. Der Standard wrote that Kreutzer had several conversations with the second actor about the #MeToo rumors circulating about him around the start of the shooting for Corsage. After the rumors were repeatedly brought to Kreutzer, she had several conversations with the actor, who always claimed that the rumors were unfounded. Kreutzer then recommended that he turn to "We_do", the contact and advice center for the film and television industry of Austria. According to reports, the actor followed her advice and is said to have deposited his willingness to talk at "We_do" if he was reported by those affected. 

On 17 January 2023, Corsage's production company, Film AG, issued a statement on the second actor accused of sexual assault: "Of course we take such allegations seriously, even if they have nothing to do with the production of the film 'Corsage' directly. Director Marie Kreutzer commented in detail on this last summer. Back then, she tried to get to the bottom of the rumors with both the actor and many whistleblowers. We had another detailed conversation with the actor yesterday. This conversation didn't bring us any new information either," the statement said. The actor's current lawyer told Austrian newspaper Kleine Zeitung'' that there is no investigation against him. On 20 January 2023, the actor issued a statement denying the allegations through his lawyer.

Release
The film had its world premiere in the Un Certain Regard section of the Cannes Film Festival on 20 May 2022. Shortly thereafter, IFC Films acquired U.S. distribution rights to the film while the rights for the United Kingdom and the Republic of Ireland went to Picturehouse Entertainment. It also screened at the Toronto International Film Festival in September 2022 and the 60th New York Film Festival the following month.

It was released in Austria and Germany on 7 July 2022, by Panda Lichtspiele Filmverleih and Alamode Film, respectively. and it was released in the United States on 23 December 2022, in the United Kingdom on 26 December 2022, and in France on 25 January 2023 by Ad Vitam Distribution.

Reception

Critical reception
On the review aggregator website Rotten Tomatoes, 85% of 137 critics' reviews are positive, with an average rating of 7.3/10. The website's consensus reads, "Corsage puts a refreshingly irreverent spin on period biopic formulas, further elevated by Vicky Krieps' terrific turn in the central role". Metacritic assigned the film a weighted average score of 76 out of 100 based on 35 critics' reviews, indicating "generally favorable reviews".

Accolades

See also
 List of submissions to the 95th Academy Awards for Best International Feature Film
 List of Austrian submissions for the Academy Award for Best International Feature Film

References

External links
 

2022 films
Austrian multilingual films
Austrian historical drama films
2020s German films
2020s German-language films
2020s English-language films
2020s French films
2020s French-language films
2020s Hungarian-language films
2020s historical drama films
2022 drama films
2022 independent films
2022 multilingual films
Arte France Cinéma films
Austrian independent films
Casting controversies in film
Cultural depictions of Empress Elisabeth of Austria
Drama films based on actual events
Film controversies in Austria
Film controversies in Germany
Film controversies
Films about depression
Films about royalty
Films set in 1877
Films set in 1878
Films set in Bavaria
Films set in Marche
Films set in Northamptonshire
Films set in Vienna
Films shot in Belgium
Films shot in France
Films shot in Italy
Films shot in Luxembourg
Films shot in Vienna
French films based on actual events
French historical drama films
French independent films
French multilingual films
French-language German films
French-language Luxembourgian films
German films based on actual events
German historical drama films
German independent films
German multilingual films
Luxembourgian drama films
Luxembourgian independent films
Obscenity controversies in film
Political controversies in film
Sexual-related controversies in film